The Narrow Road is a 2022 Hong Kong drama film and the second full-length feature directed by Lam Sum. Set during the early days of the Covid pandemic, it tells the story of Chak (Louis Cheung) who struggles to keep his cleaning company afloat. In the midst of the challenge, he develops a bond with a newly hired cleaner Candy (Angela Yuen) who is his neighbour and also a single mother. The film had its world premiere at the Edinburgh International Film Festival on 19 August 2022.

Cast
 Louis Cheung as Chak (Chan Hon-fat)
 Angela Yuen as Candy
 Patra Au as Wong Ying, Chak’s mother
 Chu Pak-hon as a car mechanic/friend of Chak’s
 Chu Pak-him as a car mechanic/friend of Chak’s
 Tung On-na as Chu, Candy’s daughter

Reception
Writing for Deadline Hollywood, Anna Smith called the film "a thought-provoking insight into Hong Kong lockdown life, with terrific performances and a tangible atmosphere." At Screen International, Fionnuala Halligan described The Narrow Road as a "tender, thoughtful film" that "deliver[s] a subtle and affecting portrait of a difficult time in a unique place",  and "a love song to [the director's] city and the low-paid labour on which it was founded".

Awards and nominations

References

External links
 
 

2022 films
2022 drama films
Hong Kong drama films
2020s Cantonese-language films
Films about the COVID-19 pandemic